Walter de Baltrodin [Baltroddi; Baltroddie] (died 1270) was a 13th-century Scottish bishop; if his name can be taken as a guide, he came from "Baltrodin" – Baltroddie (Pitroddie) – in Gowrie. Although it is not known which university or universities he attended, he had achieved a Master's Degree by 1259 and was later a Doctor of Canon Law.

He held canonries in the dioceses of Aberdeen and Caithness when, in 1263, he was elected Bishop of Caithness. The decree of election was presented to Pope Urban IV by Roger de Castello, a canon  of Aberdeen. The election was declared contrary to canon law, but the Pope took into account the poverty of the diocese of Caithness with the costs of the journey to Rome from such a distant diocese, and delegated the authority to judge the fitness of Walter to the Bishops of Dunkeld, Brechin and Ross.

As is usual with bishops of Caithness, very little is known about Walter's episcopate. It is known he received a subsidy from the king taken from the profits of justice in the province. According to Clan Mackay tradition, Aodh Mór MacAoidh (or Iye Mackay), married a daughter of Bishop Walter, acquiring 12 davochs of land at Durness.

Bishop Walter died sometime in the year 1270. His death was followed, after some delay, by the election of Nicholas, Abbot of Scone.

Notes

References
  Crawford, Barbara E., "Baltroddi, Walter of (d. 1270)", in the Oxford Dictionary of National Biography, Oxford University Press, 2004 , accessed 20 Feb 2007
 Dowden, John, The Bishops of Scotland, ed. J. Maitland Thomson, (Glasgow, 1912)
 Keith, Robert, An Historical Catalogue of the Scottish Bishops: Down to the Year 1688, (London, 1924)
 Watt, D.E.R., Fasti Ecclesiae Scoticanae Medii Aevi ad annum 1638, 2nd Draft, (St Andrews, 1969)

External links
Stirnet: Mackay01 (Walter and his daughter are mentioned at top of page)

1270 deaths
Bishops of Caithness
Medieval Gaels from Scotland
People from Perth and Kinross
13th-century Scottish Roman Catholic bishops
Year of birth unknown